The Stony Point (Henderson) Light is a lighthouse on the shore of Lake Ontario near Henderson Bay in New York. The site was established in 1826, and the original lighthouse was lit in 1869. The light and attached keeper's quarters are currently privately owned. A new light was built in 1945, and it was automated in 1950. This light is maintained by the US Coast Guard. The site is not open to the public.

History
Stony Point (Henderson) Light is listed as one of New York's Historic Light Stations.

References

Further reading
 Oleszewski, Wes. Great Lakes Lighthouses, American and Canadian: A Comprehensive Directory/Guide to Great Lakes Lighthouses, (Gwinn, Michigan: Avery Color Studios, Inc., 1998) .
 
 U.S. Coast Guard. Historically Famous Lighthouses (Washington, D.C.: Government Printing Office, 1957).
 Wright, Larry and Wright, Patricia. Great Lakes Lighthouses Encyclopedia Hardback (Erin: Boston Mills Press, 2006)

External links
 
 Lighthouse Friends site
 
 National Park Service Historic Lighthouses
 NPS for Stony Point on Henderson Bay

Lighthouses completed in 1869
Lighthouses completed in 1950
Lighthouses in Jefferson County, New York
1869 establishments in New York (state)